Air Groups (Air Divisions) of the Imperial Japanese Army were units typically formed by aggregating several (4-8) aviation regiments (Sentais) for the training or large-scale military operations.

List of Air Divisions

Notes

 A
Air
Air
Air divisions